Alexandra Hamilton may refer to:

 Alex Coomber (née Alexandra Hamilton, born 1973), British skeleton racer
 Alexandra Hamilton, Duchess of Abercorn (1946–2018)